Francis Edward Street (16 February 1851 – 4 June 1928) was an English cricketer who played in four first-class matches for Kent County Cricket Club during the mid-1870s. He was a right-handed batsman who played regular club cricket for a range of sides as a prolific batsman.

Street was born at Hampstead in Middlesex in 1851, the son of Henry and Jane Street. His father was a solicitor. Street was educated at Uppingham School where he played cricket in the school side. He played club cricket for Uppingham Rovers, a strong side during the 1880s, as well as other amateur sides such as Beckenham, Free Foresters, Incogniti and MCC.

Living for a time at Brasted in Kent, he made his first-class debut for the county side in 1875 against Derbyshire, making two further appearances the same year against Sussex and playing in the return match against Derbyshire. He played his final first-class appearance in 1877 against Nottinghamshire. Street had little success in his four appearances, scoring just 21 runs, with a high score of 12. He was described in Scores and Biographies as "A promising bat and good field, generally taking long-leg or cover-point."

Street worked as a chartered accountant. He married Sarah Partridge in 1883; the couple had five children. He died at Armidale, New South Wales in 1928 aged 77 whilst visiting Australia.

References

External links

1851 births
1928 deaths
People from Hampstead
People educated at Uppingham School
English cricketers
Kent cricketers